was a Japanese film actor. He appeared in more than 100 films from 1944 to 1985.

Selected filmography

References

External links
 

1917 births
1993 deaths
Japanese male film actors
20th-century Japanese male actors
People from Munakata, Fukuoka